Halifax Street is a street in the south-eastern sector of the centre of Adelaide, South Australia. It runs east–west between East Terrace and King William Street, crossing Hutt Street and Pulteney Street and passing through Hurtle Square. It was named after Sir Charles Wood (later Charles Wood, 1st Viscount Halifax), British Member of Parliament for Halifax.

Circa 1844 Halifax Street became the location of one of Adelaide's first breweries, founded by William Henry Clark who later built a flour mill close by. The brewery and mill were sited on city acres 564 and 603 between Halifax and Gilles streets which, from 1909 to 1950, housed Adelaide's rubbish incinerator.

Junction list

See also

References

Streets in Adelaide